Diamonds is a greatest hits album by English musician Elton John spanning his hits from 1970 to 2016. The album was released on 10 November 2017. It was released in a single disc version, a 2-CD version, a 3-CD deluxe box set, and a 2-LP vinyl version. The two disc and vinyl versions have either as many or fewer songs than the previous multi-platinum collection.

It is the first career-spanning compilation of John's music since the release of Rocket Man: The Definitive Hits in 2007. It was released to commemorate the 50 years of John's work with lyricist Bernie Taupin. Although their collaboration began in 1967, the oldest hit in the album is "Your Song", from John's eponymous 1970 album. The limited edition 3-CD box set version of Diamonds includes a 72-page hardback book with annotations for the stories behind each track and a set of five postcards of illustrations of Elton John by contemporary artist Richard Kilroy.

In February 2022, the British Phonographic Industry certified Diamonds triple Platinum for sales of 900,000 units. In the United States the Recording Industry Association of America certified Diamonds Platinum for sales of 1,000,000 units.

Track listing

2-CD and 3-CD releases

Disc one

Disc two

Deluxe edition box set extra CD

2-LP version

Side A

Side B

Side C

Side D

1-CD version

2022 digital reissue

Disc one

Disc two

Disc three

Charts

Weekly charts

Year-end charts

Certifications

Notes

References

2017 greatest hits albums
Albums produced by Elton John
Elton John compilation albums
The Rocket Record Company compilation albums
Universal Music Group compilation albums